The 1956 Nobel Prize in Literature was awarded to the Spanish poet Juan Ramón Jiménez (1881–1958) "for his lyrical poetry, which in Spanish language constitutes an example of high spirit and artistical purity" He is the third Spanish recipient of the prize after the dramatist Jacinto Benavente in 1922.

Laureate

Juan Ramón Jiménez belonged to the literary movement called modernismo. His early poetry was inspired by German romanticism and French symbolism that is visual and full of imagery and predominated by the colors yellow and green. Then he later turned to poetic prose in which the color white predominates; this is clearly evident in Diario de un poeta recién casado ("Diary of a Recently Married Poet", 1917). Jimenez worked as a poet, literary critic and editor of a literary magazine. Among his famous poem collections include Platero y yo ("Platero and I", 1956), Piedra y cielo ("Stones and Sky", 1919), and Voces de mi copla ("Voices of My Song", 1945)

Deliberations

Nominations
Jiménez was first nominated in 1952 before being awarded the 1956 Nobel Prize in Literature. Each year he received a single nomination, summing up to 5 nominations in all. His last nomination was made by the Swedish academy member, Harry Martinson.

In total, the Nobel committee received 158 nominations for 44 individuals. Among the nominees include Graham Greene, Nikos Kazantzakis, André Malraux, Albert Camus (awarded in 1957), Zalman Shneour, Johan Falkberget, Ezra Pound, and Giuseppe Ungaretti. The most nominations were for Ramón Menéndez Pidal with 95 nominations, but was not awarded. 17 of the nominees were nominated first-time including Henry de Montherlant, Jorge Luis Borges, Marcel Pagnol, Gabriel Marcel, Gonzague de Reynold, Pablo Neruda (awarded in 1971), and Jules Supervielle. Four of the nominees were women: Melpo Axioti, Elizabeth Goudge, Marthe Bibesco, and Karen Blixen.

The authors Pío Baroja, Devorah Baron, Edmund Clerihew Bentley, Louis Bromfield, Carlos Bulosan, Ion Călugăru, Owen Davis, Alexander Fadeyev, Sheila Kaye-Smith, Yakub Kolas, Paul Léautaud, Louis Madelin, Henry Louis Mencken, Alan Alexander Milne, Leonora Speyer, Michael Ventris, Samad Vurgun, and Robert Walser died in 1956 without having been nominated for the prize. German playwright Bertolt Brecht died before the only chance to be rewarded.

Reactions

The strongest contender for the 1956 Nobel Prize was the Spanish historian and philologist Ramón Menéndez Pidal with 95 nominations from academics, critics, authors, literary societies and politicians. His surmounting nomination was snubbed instead by the Swedish Academy and given to the poet, Juan Ramón Jiménez, who was nominated by Harry Martinson, an academy member. The rejection of Menéndez Pidal sparked heavy criticisms from the literary world. He received 154 nominations in all since 1931 up to 1968, the year he died.

The Nobel citation for Juan Ramón Jiménez, says: 

According to Burton Feldman, in his book The Nobel Prize: A History of Geniuses Controversy, and Prestige, the selection of Jiménez was made as form of recompense for the neglected past generation of writers who had set out a unique revival of Spanish writing in 1898, which includes Antonio and Manuel Machado, Ramón del Valle-Inclán, Miguel de Unamuno, the Nicaraguan Rubén Darío (then living in Spain), and Jiménez among them. Feldman said:  "But making him a stand-in for a neglected generation renders his own honor ambiguous. Did he deserve the honor on his own, or because the others died ignored and he happened to live so long?"

Award Ceremony
Jiménez was unable to be present at the Nobel Banquet at the Swedish Academy in Stockholm, December 10, 1956, thus his speech was read by Jaime Benítez Rexach, Rector of the University of Puerto Rico. His very reasons why he was unable to participate in the event was that he was emotionally devastated over the death of his wife, Zenobia Camprubí, from ovarian cancer and because of his intermittent sickness caused by old age. In his sorrow, Jiménez said: "Besieged by sorrow and sickness, I must remain in Puerto Rico, unable to participate directly in the solemnities... My wife Zenobia is the true winner of this Prize. Her companionship, her help, her inspiration made, for forty years, my work possible. Today, without her, I am desolate and helpless."

References

External links
Award Ceremony speech nobelprize.org

1956